The swimming competition at the 1985 Summer Universiade took place in Kobe, Japan from August 25 to August 30, 1985.

Men's events

Legend:

Women's events

Legend:

Medal table

References

Medalist Summary (Men) on GBRATHLETICS.com
Medalist Summary (Women) on GBRATHLETICS.com

1985 in swimming
Swimming at the Summer Universiade
1985 Summer Universiade